Ischnothelidaeis a family of mygalomorph spiders. It was first described as a subfamily of the family Dipluridae by F.O. Pickard-Cambridge in 1897 and raised to a family by Opatova et al. in 2020. They are also known as scatter-web spiders.

Genera
Andethele Coyle, 1995
Indothele Coyle, 1995
Ischnothele Ausserer, 1875
Lathrothele Benoit, 1965
Thelechoris Karsch, 1881

See also 

 List of Ischnothelidae species

References

Mygalomorphae
Mygalomorphae families